The 2002 VMI Keydets football team represented the Virginia Military Institute during the 2002 NCAA Division I-AA football season. It was the Keydets' 112th year of football, and their 79th and final season in the Southern Conference until 2014).

Schedule

Source: 2002 VMI Football Schedule

References

VMI
VMI Keydets football seasons
VMI Keydets football